Alex Calderoni (born 31 May 1976) is an Italian football goalkeeper who currently plays for A.P.D. Ribelle 1927.

Career
Calderoni joined  Alzano in a co-ownership deal in 1998. In 2000 Calderoni was acquired by Atalanta from Cesena. He was immediately left for Serie B club Ravenna in a temporary deal.

On 31 August 2007 Calderoni joined Treviso for €200,000 transfer fee. (with additional €30,000 other cost occurred for Treviso)

In 2008 Calderoni joined Torino F.C.

In January 2011 Calderoni was re-signed by A.C. Cesena in a temporary deal.

References

1976 births
Italian footballers
Atalanta B.C. players
Torino F.C. players
Ravenna F.C. players
Virtus Bergamo Alzano Seriate 1909 players
A.C. Cesena players
Forlì F.C. players
A.C. Monza players
Treviso F.B.C. 1993 players
U.S. Triestina Calcio 1918 players
Atletico Roma F.C. players
Calcio Padova players
S.S. Juve Stabia players
Carrarese Calcio players
A.P.D. Ribelle 1927 players
Serie A players
Serie B players
Serie C players
Association football goalkeepers
Living people